The Neon Empire is a 1989 American television crime-drama miniseries directed by Larry Peerce and starring Ray Sharkey and Linda Fiorentino. It originally aired on two consecutive nights (December 3 and 4, 1989) on Showtime.

Plot
Junior Morloff, a Jewish gangster, is traveling out west when he comes across Las Vegas, a small town at the time. Surprised that gambling is legal there, he gets an idea to build a casino.

Cast 

  Ray Sharkey as Junior Molov 
  Linda Fiorentino as Lucy 
  Gary Busey as Frank Weston 
  Dylan McDermott as Vic
  Martin Landau as Max
  Julie Carmen as Miranda
  Harry Guardino as Nick
  Michael Zelniker as Burt Stone
  Richard Brooks as Tampa
  Andreas Katsulas as Vito
  Dale Dye as Chief Bates
  Tyra Ferrell as Samantha
  Natalia Nogulich as Mildred

References

External links

1989 television films
1989 films
American crime drama films
1989 crime drama films
Films directed by Larry Peerce
Films scored by Lalo Schifrin
American drama television films
Films set in the Las Vegas Valley
Films with screenplays by Edward Anhalt
1980s English-language films
1980s American films